Trenčín (also known by other alternative names) is a city in western Slovakia of the central Váh River valley near the Czech border, around  from Bratislava. It has a population of more than 55,000, which makes it the eighth largest municipality of the country and is the seat of the Trenčín Region and the Trenčín District. It has a medieval castle, Trenčín Castle, on a rock above the city.

Trenčín is chosen as the European Capital of Culture in 2026.

Names and etymology

Trenčín was first mentioned under the Greek name Leukaristos (Λευκάριστος), depicted on the Ptolemy world map around 150 CE. During the course of the Marcomannic Wars between the Roman Empire and Germanic Quadi, the Romans carved an inscription on the rock under the present-day castle in 179 CE and the place was mentioned as Laugaricio. For a long time it was considered the northernmost known presence of the Romans in Central Europe.

The first written mentions in the Middle Ages are from 1111 (as Treinchen) and 1113 (adjective Trenciniensis).  The name is probably derived from a personal name Trnka/Trenka (Slovak/Slavic - Blackthorn) with a possessive suffix -ín. The German, Hungarian, and Polish forms are Trentschin, Trencsén, and Trenczyn, respectively.

History

The site of Trenčín has been inhabited since time immemorial. Trenčín Castle, a typical medieval fortified castle is situated high on a rock above the city.
Trenčín is best known for a Roman inscription on the rock below the Trenčín Castle dating from 179 AD, the era of the Marcomannic Wars, a series of wars between the Roman Empire and the Germanic Quadi and Marcomanni. It denotes the site as Laugaricio and for long time it was the most northern known evidence of the presence of Roman soldiers in central Europe (until the Roman fort by Mušov and marching camps by Olomouc and Hulín were found).

Trenčín is one of the suggested locations for the capital of Samo's Empire in the 7th century. Wogastisburg (Vogast castle) was probably located somewhere on the Vah (Vogas) river and was also the site of a decisive battle between the Slavic and Frankish armies in 631.

It is plausible that Trenčín Castle was founded during the Great Moravian era. In the beginning of the 11th century, the region was controlled by king Bolesław I the Brave of Poland. In 1017, Stephen I of Hungary conquered the region which remained part of Hungary until 1918. By the end of the 11th century, the castle became the administrative centre of Trencsén county in the Kingdom of Hungary. As one of the few stone castles in the country it resisted the disastrous invasion of Mongols in 1241. In 1263 Trenčín was in the possession of Jakab Cseszneky royal swordbearer, but in 1302 King Wenceslas I took it away from the Cseszneky brothers because they were supporting his rival Charles Robert, and donated it to Matthew III Csák. Between 1302 and 1321 the castle was the seat of the powerful magnate Matthew Csák who controlled most of what is now Slovakia. Challenging the authority of king Charles Robert, Matthew Csák maintained a large court and pursued his own foreign policy. The Treaty of Trentschin between Bohemia, Hungary, and Poland was signed in the city in 1335.

Trenčín gained a number of privileges during the Middle Ages: In 1324 the inhabitants were freed from paying tolls and the city received free royal town privileges in 1412 from King Sigismund. However, during the following decades and centuries there were catastrophes and wars which lasted until the end of the 18th century. During the conflict between the Habsburgs and the supporters of the rival king, János Szapolyai, the town was captured in 1528 by imperial troops. In the 17th century the Ottomans were another threat from the south but they failed to conquer the city. The town then suffered from the Kuruc uprising against the Habsburgs and on 3 August 1708 the Battle of Trenčín took place close to the city. Two years later a plague killed 1,600 inhabitants of the city. Finally, in 1790 the town, along with the castle, was burned down and the castle has been in ruins ever since.

In the 19th century Trenčín flourished, as the railways to Žilina and Bratislava were built and many new enterprises were established, particularly in the textile, food and machine industries.

The town became the hub of the middle Považie (Váh) region.

In 1867 Trenčín was downgraded from a "free royal town" to a "town with municipal government" and came under the direct control of the chief of Trenčín county.

Trenčín flourished again during the era of the first Czechoslovak republic and became the capital of the Trenčín county again between 1940 and 1945 when the Slovak Republic was in existence.

Shortly after the Slovak National Uprising began, Trenčín was occupied by Nazi Germany and it became the headquarters of the Sicherheitsdienst and the Gestapo.

Trenčín was captured by the Romanian and Soviet troops on 10 April 1945.

Since 1990, the historical centre of the city has been largely restored and since 1996 it has been the seat of Trenčín Region and Trenčín District. The castle and its Roman inscription have attracted tourism since.

Geography
It lies in the Trenčín Basin of north-western Slovakia, which is surrounded by the Strážov Mountains, Považský Inovec and White Carpathians, with the last mentioned being a protected area. The Váh River flows in the north–south axis.

Climate
Trenčín lies in the north temperate zone and has a continental climate with four distinct seasons. It is characterized by a significant variation between hot summers and cold, snowy winters.

Tourism and sights

The city is dominated by Trenčín Castle, which is the third-largest castle in Slovakia. Trenčín Castle is divided into upper and lower sections, with extensive fortifications. The upper castle has several palace buildings which surround the central medieval tower, which remains the highest point of the city. Below the castle, on the hillside, is the old parish church and a small upper square which is reached by historic covered stairs as well as by winding side streets. The old town has a large main square, with a large baroque church and various shops, as well as a town tower.
The Trenčín Synagogue, built in 1913 is now a cultural center with exhibitions and concerts.

Pohoda, the most visited music festival in Slovakia, has been organized in Trenčín since 1997. , it takes place at the Trenčín Airport.

Demographics
In 2005 the city had a population of 56,750. In 2009 Trenčín had a population of 60,012. According to the 2001 census the religious makeup was: 65.8% Roman Catholics, 22.3% people with no religious affiliation, and 7.1% Lutherans. 95.3% inhabitants were Slovaks and 2.4% Czechs.

Sport
Association football club AS Trenčín currently plays in the top-tier Slovak Super Liga after winning promotion following the 2011–12 season as second-tier Slovak First League champions, while the ice hockey club Dukla Trenčín currently plays in the Slovak Extraliga, having won the Extraliga championship four times.

Trenčín is the hometown of several professional ice hockey players, including Ottawa Senators forward Marián Gáborík, New York Islanders defenceman Zdeno Chára, and Chicago Blackhawks forward Marián Hossa, all playing in the National Hockey League (NHL) in North America. Additionally, long-time Liverpool centre back Martin Škrtel hails from Trenčín.

The festival for non-Olympic sports will be held in town 2017.

Stanley Cup appearances in Trenčín
The top-level professional ice hockey championship trophy in North America, the Stanley Cup, has been brought to Trenčín six times between the years 2008 and 2015:
 2008 – Tomáš Kopecký celebrated his Stanley Cup win after the victory of the Detroit Red Wings over the Pittsburgh Penguins. A noteworthy circumstance is that the Cup's appearance with Kopecký came after the first-ever Stanley Cup Final appearance for a Trenčíner in Marián Hossa, who, with the Penguins, lost that series.
 2010 – Marián Hossa, who played in Dukla Trenčín in the 1996–97 season, won the Cup with the Chicago Blackhawks. In Trenčín, he celebrated together with teammate Tomáš Kopecký, who had won the Cup for the second time. Although Hossa was not born in Trenčín, he grew up and lived in the town until he was drafted into the NHL.
 2011 – Captain of the Boston Bruins Zdeno Chára won the trophy when the Bruins defeated Vancouver Canucks. Chára was born in Trenčín and lived there his whole life until he was drafted into the NHL.
 2013 – In the shortened 2012–13 season, Marián Hossa won the Cup again with Chicago Blackhawks together with Slovak teammate Michal Handzuš, who brought the Cup to his hometown Banská Bystrica one day before it traveled to celebrations in Trenčín.
 2014 Marián Gáborík, who was born and who grew up in Trenčín, won trophy when playing for Los Angeles Kings. In the Final, the Kings defeated New York Rangers in five games series. With 14 goals, Gaborik was the top scorer of 2014 playoffs.
 2015 – Marián Hossa, for the third time in his career, won the Cup after the Blackhawks defeated the Tampa Bay Lightning in six games in the 2015 Finals.

Education
Trenčín is home to the public Alexander Dubček University with 7,140 students, including 110 doctoral students, and the private College of Management in Trenčín with 1,275 students. The city's system of primary education consists of nine public schools and one religious primary school, enrolling 4,623 pupils overall. Secondary education is represented by five gymnasia with 1,974 students, 5 specialized high schools with 1,892 students, and 6 vocational schools with 3,975 students.

Transport
Trenčín lies near the main Slovak motorway and is an important stop on the main railway line from Bratislava to Žilina and Košice. Roads from the city also lead into the Czech Republic to Brno and other parts of Slovakia; Prievidza/Nitra. Railway tracks from the aforementioned cities end in Trenčín. Trenčín has also an airport. But the closest international airport is in Bratislava.

Territorial division
Trenčín is divided into four main boroughs:

 Stred (center): Staré mesto (old town), Dolné mesto (lower town), Dlhé Hony, Noviny, Biskupice
 Juh (south): Juh I-III
 Sever (north): Sihoť I-IV, Opatová nad Váhom, Pod Sokolice, Kubrá, Kubrica
 Západ (west): Zámostie, Kvetná, Istebník, Orechové, Zlatovce, Nové Zlatovce, Záblatie

Notable people
 Zdeno Chára (born 1977), ice hockey player
 Monika Chochlikova (born 1996), kickboxer and Muay Thai fighter
 Ignaz Grossmann (1825–1897), rabbi

Twin towns – sister cities

Trenčín is twinned with:

 Cran-Gevrier, France

 Zlín, Czech Republic
 Tarnów, Poland
 Casalecchio di Reno, Italy
 Békéscsaba, Hungary
 Kragujevac, Serbia

See also
 List of people from Trenčín
 Marcus Valerius Maximianus

References

External links

 Official city website

 Trenčín information
 Satellite picture of the Trenčín Castle

 
Cities and towns in Slovakia
Trenčín Region